Leiomy Maldonado (born April 28, 1987), known as the "Wonder Woman of Vogue", is a transgender Afro-Puerto Rican dancer, instructor, model, activist, and ballroom dancer. She is the founder of the House of Amazon and best known for her voguing. Maldonado introduced a new style of voguing which is more athletic and dramatic when she entered into the scene in early 2000s New York.

She was a member of the dance troupe "Vogue Evolution", which was featured on Season 4 of America's Best Dance Crew. She has worked with artists such as Willow Smith, Icona Pop, and CocoRosie.

Career
Leiomy Maldonado was born on April 28, 1987, in the Bronx. Maldonado was first introduced to voguing at the age of 15 at the Kips Bay Boys & Girls Club in the Bronx. She has said that a mentor there introduced her by giving her a VHS tape: I went home and I put that tape in and I was immediately intrigued by everything about voguing, everything I saw; the energy, the battling, and just the different personalities that you see through every girl that was on the VHS tape.A year later at 16, she was introduced to the ballroom scene and became an active member of the community in New York. Ballroom is an underground subculture created by mostly impoverished Black and Latino LGBT youth, where they could safely express themselves through dance battles and pageantry. Maldonado cites Ballroom icons Yolanda Jourdan & Alloura Jourdan Zion as her main influences behind her vogue.

She is the first-ever openly transgender woman to appear on MTV's America's Best Dance Crew Season 4 in 2009, where her crew made it to the top five. After appearing on TV, Maldonado's signature hair flip move, "The Leiomy Lolly", was adopted by musicians and celebrities, such as Janet Jackson, Beyoncé, Lady Gaga, and Britney Spears. Maldonado appeared in Willow Smith's "Whip My Hair" music video, doing her signature move. While the moves she has created have become known worldwide, credit has not always been given to her as the originator.

She went on to appear in other music videos, such as Icona Pop's "All Night" music video, which paid tribute to the 1991 documentary Paris is Burning, and the video of Russian pop singer Philipp Kirkorov "Цвет настроения синий" (Mood colour is blue).

Pose 

Maldonado is the choreographer for the ballroom scenes in the show Pose. She also appeared in Pose playing the character Florida Ferocity.

Legendary 

Maldonado is one of the judges on the HBO Max show Legendary, a dance competition inspired by the world of ballroom. Ten Houses compete against each other in weekly vogue battles, with a different theme for each episode. Maldonado appeared as a judge alongside actor Jameela Jamil, celebrity stylist Law Roach, and rapper Megan Thee Stallion. When interviewed about why she joined the show, Maldonado said, "I think they will learn how important ballroom culture is for us, for our community. They’ll also experience how much hard work it takes for us to prepare for these balls and how important it is for us to be celebrated and have a platform to showcase our talent."

Other work 
Maldonado was the star of the Nike "#BeTrue" advertisement, in support of Pride Month 2017; she is only the second transgender athlete to be featured in a Nike video advertisement. She also starred in Black Opal's beauty campaign as their first trans model.

She appears in the second episode of the docuseries My House and is the "mother" of Tati 007.

Maldonado has also walked the runway in New York Fashion Week and in the Savage X Fenty Show in September 2021, a TV special about the fashion show of Rihanna's lingerie clothing line Savage X Fenty.

Filmography

Television

See also
 LGBT culture in New York City
 List of LGBT people from New York City

References

External links
 Official website
 Instagram

1987 births
Living people
Dancers from New York (state)
LGBT choreographers
LGBT dancers
LGBT Hispanic and Latino American people
LGBT people from New York (state)
People from the Bronx
People of Afro–Puerto Rican descent
Transgender artists
Transgender female models
Transgender women
Reality dancing competition contestants